Amnesia (stylized as Amne$ia) is an American television game show that aired on Fridays at 8:00 PM ET on NBC, after debuting on February 22, 2008 at 9:00 PM ET after 1 vs. 100. Contestants win money by answering questions about their own lives. The program was produced by Mark Burnett, producer of other shows like Survivor, The Apprentice, and Are You Smarter Than a 5th Grader?, and was hosted by comedian Dennis Miller. Contestants were able to win up to $250,000.

Gameplay
The game was played in five rounds:

Round 1: You In 60 Seconds
Instead of standard welcome intros, Amnesia began with a speed round. The contestant had 60 seconds to answer seven questions, winning $1,000 for each correct answer, for a maximum of $7,000. There was no penalty for wrong answers, and the money won in this round was the contestant's to keep.

Rounds 2–4

In the next three rounds, the contestant was sent to a soundproof booth and a loved one was asked about various events they have shared with the player. The contestant then returned and was asked questions. Occasionally, in lieu of a question, the contestant had to complete a stunt to be credited with a correct answer (such as trying to place the names of five obscure body parts on a dummy within 30 seconds); a frequent stunt was a blindfolded taste test of a familiar family recipe, with three imitation dishes. A total of seven questions were played throughout those rounds, and the maximum possible total was $75,000.

Round 5: Total Amnesia

Risk was a factor in this round, so the player was given the option to stop or proceed before each question in this round.

If they chose to proceed, a question was chosen by picking one of their supporters, each holding an envelope that contained a question about their relationship. The contestant did not need to have the full value of a question in their bank in order to attempt it (e.g., a player with $5,000 was allowed to attempt the $100,000 question).

A correct answer to a question in that round added money to the player's bank, but a wrong answer subtracted that amount. Before each question the player had the option to stop and take the money already won, but if at any time the bank fell to $0, the game ended and the player left with whatever they won in round 1.

If the player answered all 10 questions in the main game and all seven questions in the speed round, the player won a maximum total of $250,000.

U.S. Standard Ratings
The ratings for Amnesia were as follows while competing for another game show My Dad Is Better Than Your Dad.

International versions

See also
 Opportunity Knocks

References

External links
 

NBC original programming
2000s American game shows
2008 American television series debuts
2008 American television series endings
Television series created by Mark Burnett